Saint-Yorre is a commune in the Allier department, Auvergne-Rhône-Alpes (Auvergne as former region), central France. The locality is renowned for its highly mineralized mineral water.

Population

Administration

List of mayors 
 1977-2008: Jésus Moran
 March 2008–November 2014: Roger Levillain
 November 2014–current: Joseph Kuchna

See also
 Communes of the Allier department

References
 Official website (in French)

Communes of Allier
Allier communes articles needing translation from French Wikipedia